Wellburn is a surname.  Notable people with the surname include:

 Elizabeth Wellburn (born 1955), Canadian author
 Gerald Wellburn (1900–1992), Canadian philatelist